McAreavey is a surname. Notable people with the surname include:

John McAreavey (born 1949), Northern Irish clergyman
John McAreavey (Gaelic footballer), nephew of the clergyman
Michaela McAreavey (1983–2011), murdered on her honeymoon in Mauritius
Paul McAreavey (born 1980), Northern Irish footballer

References
More information on surname McAreavey